The 1902–03 United States Senate elections were held on various dates in various states. As these U.S. Senate elections were prior to the ratification of the Seventeenth Amendment in 1913, senators were chosen by state legislatures. Senators were elected over a wide range of time throughout 1902 and 1903, and a seat may have been filled months late or remained vacant due to legislative deadlock. In these elections, terms were up for the senators in Class 3.

The Democratic Party gained four seats, but the Republicans kept their strong majority. This election marked the end of the two third parties, the Populists and Silver Republicans. Republicans took both Populist seats (Idaho and Kansas) along with one Silver Republican seat in Washington. Democrats took the other Silver Republican seat in Colorado as incumbent Senator Henry Teller was re-elected as a Democrat and flipped four Republican seats in Maryland, Kentucky, North Carolina, and Nevada. Republicans flipped only one Democratic seat (Utah), but also gained both vacant Delaware seats, which had been empty due to legislative deadlock in 1898 and 1900, respectively.

Besides the double-barrel special elections in Delaware, a special election was held in Michigan.

In Florida, the legislature failed to elect until shortly after the beginning of the 58th Congress on March 4.

Results summary 
Senate party division, 58th Congress (1903–1905)

 Majority party: Republican (57)
 Minority party: Democratic (33)
 Vacant (0)
 Total seats: 90

Change in composition

Before the elections 
After the January 29, 1902, special election in New Jersey.

Result of the elections

Beginning of the next Congress

Race summaries

Elections during the 57th Congress 
In these elections, the winners were elected and seated during 1902 or in 1903 before March 4.

Elections ordered by date, then state.

Races leading to the 58th Congress 

In these regular elections, the winners were elected for the term beginning March 4, 1903; ordered by state.

All of the elections involved the Class 3 seats.

Election during the 58th Congress 
In this election, the winner was elected in 1903 after March 4.

Alabama

Arkansas

California

Colorado

Connecticut

Delaware

Delaware (special, class 1) 

In the 1898/1899 elections, the Delaware legislature had failed to elect a successor to Democratic senator George Gray.

Four years later, Republican congressman L. Heisler Ball was elected in 1903 to finish the term.

He would lose re-election at the 1905 end of the term due to yet another deadlock in the state legislature.

After the advent of popular elections, Ball would return in 1919 for a single full term.

Delaware (special, class 2) 

In the 1900/1901 elections, the Delaware legislature had failed to elect a successor to Democratic senator Richard R. Kenney.

Two years later, Republican state senator J. Frank Allee was elected in 1903 to finish the term.

Allee would retire at the end of the term in 1907.

Florida 

The Florida legislature failed to elect a senator by the March 4, 1903 beginning of the term.  One-term incumbent Democrat Stephen Mallory II was therefore appointed to begin the term, pending the late election.

Democratic incumbent Stephen Mallory II was elected late April 22, 1903 to finish the term.

Georgia

Idaho

Illinois

Indiana

Iowa 

There were two elections due to the death of John H. Gear in 1900.

Iowa (regular) 

Five-term William B. Allison was re-elected to a sixth term January 22, 1902.  He was Chairman of the Senate Republican Conference, effectively the leader of the Senate.

Iowa (special) 

First-term Republican John H. Gear had died July 14, 1900 and Republican Jonathan P. Dolliver had been appointed August 22, 1900 to finish the term ending in 1901 and to the term beginning thereafter, pending a special election.

Dolliver was elected January 22, 1902 to finish the term that would end in 1907.

Kansas

Kentucky

Louisiana

Maryland 

Arthur Pue Gorman was elected by an unknown margin, for the Class 3 seat.

Michigan (special)

Missouri

Nevada

New Hampshire

New Jersey (special)

New York 

The election in New York was held on January 20, 1903 by the New York State Legislature.

Republican Thomas C. Platt had previously been re-elected to this seat in 1897, and his term would expire on March 3, 1903.

At the State election in November 1902, 28 Republicans and 22 Democrats were elected for a two-year term (1903-1904) in the State Senate; and 89 Republicans and 61 Democrats were elected for the session of 1903 to the Assembly. State Senator Patrick F. Trainor who had been re-elected, died on December 25, 1902, and his successor Peter J. Dooling was elected only after the senatorial election, on January 27. The 126th New York State Legislature met from January 6 to April 23, 1903, at Albany, New York.

The Republican caucus met on January 19. 25 State senators and 84 assemblymen attended, and State Senator William W. Armstrong presided. The caucus re-nominated the incumbent U.S. Senator Thomas C. Platt almost unanimously. A single vote was cast for U.S. Secretary of War Elihu Root by Assemblyman William A. Denison, of Jefferson County. Besides Denison voting against Platt, a small number of anti-Platt men did not attend the caucus. Boss Platt had forced the nomination of Attorney General John C. Davies to the New York Supreme Court in the 5th District, against the local Republican organization's wishes who accused Davies of incompetence. Davies was defeated in a landslide by Democrat Watson M. Rogers although the 5th District was heavily Republican. Thus boss Platt's power began to wane.

The Democratic caucus met also on January 19. All 62 State legislators attended, and Assemblyman Charles W. Hinson, of Erie County, presided. They nominated John B. Stanchfield unanimously. Stanchfield had been Mayor of Elmira, and was defeated when running for Governor of New York in 1900 by Republican Benjamin B. Odell Jr.

Thomas C. Platt was the choice of both the Assembly and the State Senate, and was declared elected. Three Republican anti-Platt men, State senators Edgar T. Brackett (28th D.), Elon R. Brown and Nathaniel A. Elsberg (15th D.), voted for Elihu Root.

Note: The votes were cast on January 20, but both Houses met in a joint session on January 21 to compare nominations, and declare the result.

North Carolina

North Dakota

Ohio

Oregon

Pennsylvania 

The election in Pennsylvania was held on January 20, 1903. Boies Penrose was re-elected by the Pennsylvania General Assembly

The Pennsylvania General Assembly, consisting of the House of Representatives and the Senate, convened on January 20, 1903. Incumbent Republican Boies Penrose, who was elected in 1897, was a successful candidate for re-election to another term. The results of the vote of both houses combined are as follows:

{{Election box winning candidate with party link no change
 | party      = Republican Party (US)
 | candidate  = Boies Penrose (Incumbent)
 | votes      = 194
 | percentage = 76.38
 | change     =
}}

 |-bgcolor="#EEEEEE"
 | colspan=3 align="right" | Totals | align="right" | 254 | align="right" | 100.00%'''
|}

South Carolina

South Dakota 

Two-term Republican James H. Kyle died July 1, 1901 and Republican Alfred Kittredge was appointed July 11, 1901 to continue the term, pending a special election.

South Dakota (special) 

Republican Alfred Kittredge was elected January 20, 1903 to finish the term.

South Dakota (regular) 

Republican Alfred Kittredge was elected January 21, 1903 to the next the term.

Utah

Vermont

Washington

Wisconsin

See also 
 1902 United States elections
 1902 United States House of Representatives elections
 1903 United States House of Representatives elections
 57th United States Congress
 58th United States Congress

Notes

References

Further reading 
 Party Division in the Senate, 1789-Present, via Senate.gov